is a Japanese football player. She plays for Suwon UDC and Japan national team.

Club career
Haji was born in Nagoya on July 8, 1988. After graduating from high school, she joined INAC Kobe Leonessa in 2007. In 2012, she moved to Iga FC Kunoichi. In 2018, she moved to Mynavi Vegalta Sendai. In 2019, she moved to the South Korean club Suwon UDC.

National team career
On July 30, 2017, Haji played for the Japan national team for the first time against Australia. She played seven games for Japan until 2018.

National team statistics

References

External links

Japan Football Association

1988 births
Living people
Association football people from Aichi Prefecture
Japanese women's footballers
Japan women's international footballers
Nadeshiko League players
INAC Kobe Leonessa players
Iga FC Kunoichi players
Mynavi Vegalta Sendai Ladies players
Women's association football forwards